The Church of St Lawrence is a Grade II* listed Church of England church in Sandhurst, Gloucestershire.

It was rebuilt to a design by Thomas Fulljames in 1857–58.

References

External links 
 

Grade II* listed churches in Gloucestershire
Thomas Fulljames buildings